Vadim Mikhailovich Kozhevnikov (Togur20 October 1984, Moscow) was a Soviet writer and journalist. His daughter Nadezhda Kozhevnikova is also a writer.

Biography
Vadim Kozevnikov was born to a Russian family in the Siberian town of Togur, Tomsk Governorate, where his revolutionary-minded father, a physician, had been sent as an internal exile by the authorities of the Russian Empire.

Kozhevnikov studied literature and ethnology at Moscow State University, graduating in 1933. Kozhevnikov worked as a war correspondent for Pravda from 1941 to 1945, joining the Communist Party of the Soviet Union halfway into the German-Soviet War in 1943. He was elected secretary of the Union of Soviet Writers in 1949.

Kozhevnikov was officially recognized as a Hero of Socialist Labour for his contributions to Soviet literature and was elected to one term as a politician to the Supreme Soviet of the Soviet Union. He was awarded the USSR State Prize following the publication of two of his novels in 1971.

A full-scale overview of Kozhevnikov's work, written by Soviet literary critic Iosif Grinberg, was published in Moscow in 1972.

He died in Moscow aged 75, and was buried in the Peredelkino Cemetery.

Awards
Hero of Socialist Labour (1974)
2 Orders of Lenin (1967, 1974)
2 Orders of the Red Banner of Labour (1959, 1979)
Order of the October Revolution (1971)
2 Orders of the Patriotic War, 1st class (1945)
Order of the Red Star (1942)
USSR State Prize (1971)

English translations
The Captain, from Such a Simple Thing and Other Stories, Foreign Languages Publishing House, 1959. from Archive.org
Shield and Sword: The amazing Career of a Soviet Agent in the Nazi Secret Service, MacGibbon and Kee, 1970.Shield and Sword, Mayflower Books, 1973.The Strong in Spirit, Progress Publishers, 1973.Ivan Fomich, from Anthology of Soviet Short Stories, Vol 2, Progress Publishers, 1976.Special Subunit: Two Novellas, Imported Publications, 1984.

Bibliography
 Tales of the War (Рассказы о войне, 1942)
 The Boy from the Outskirts (Мальчик с окраины, screenplay, 1947)
 Ahead to the Dawn (Заре навстречу), 1956—1957
 Meet Baluyev! (Знакомьтесь, Балуев!), 1960 (film adaptation, 1963)
 Flying Day (День летящий), 1962
 The Shield and the Sword (Щит и меч), 1965 (film adaptation, 1968)
 At Noon on the Sunny Side (В полдень на солнечной стороне), 1973
 Roots and Herbs (Корни и крона''), 1981—1982

References

1909 births
1984 deaths
20th-century Russian journalists
20th-century Russian male writers
20th-century Russian short story writers
People from Tomsk Governorate
Moscow State University alumni
Seventh convocation members of the Soviet of the Union
Eighth convocation members of the Soviet of the Union
Ninth convocation members of the Soviet of the Union
Tenth convocation members of the Soviet of the Union
Eleventh convocation members of the Soviet of the Union
Heroes of Socialist Labour
Recipients of the Order of Lenin
Recipients of the Order of the Red Banner of Labour
Recipients of the Order of the Red Star
Recipients of the USSR State Prize
Socialist realism writers
Russian editors
Russian male journalists
Russian male novelists
Russian male short story writers
Russian male writers
Russian war correspondents
Soviet editors
Soviet journalists
Soviet male writers
Soviet novelists
Soviet short story writers
Soviet war correspondents